St Michael's is a Church of England secondary school located in the town of Chorley, Lancashire, England. The school is home to 1,200 pupils, and is a performing Arts College. Since September 2016, the headteacher has been Jayne Jenks, who took over from Julie Heaton, who had occupied the post since January 2012. She started as a teacher of physical education in 1982.

The school was established in 1964, as a Secondary Modern School. The first headteacher was Roy Moore. Educated at Lincoln College, Oxford he was an outlook, a Christian socialist, and a great believer in equality. A notable feature of the school, is that the houses and tutor groups are all named after people of notable Christian faith who have made significant personal, cultural, or religious contributions to society. The school became a comprehensive school in 1972, and an Academy in 2011.

The school's uniform is a maroon blazer incorporating the school logo and motto. The lower school tie is maroon, with multiple silver crosses. The upper school tie is the same however with a black background. Hughes or the Chapel Choir (for Years 9 to 11) have a silver tie with maroon crosses. An optional jumper for lower school is maroon with a silver logo, the higher school jumper is black with a silver logo.

Notable former pupils
Adam Henley, Welsh footballer
Nick Anderton, English footballer
Steve Pemberton, Actor
Anna Hopkin, British Swimmer
Emma Lamb, England Cricketer

References

External links
Official website

Schools in Chorley
Educational institutions established in 1964
Secondary schools in Lancashire
Church of England secondary schools in the Diocese of Blackburn
Academies in Lancashire
1964 establishments in England